Sylvie Yvert is a French writer. Born in Paris, she worked as a civil servant. In 2008, she published a collection of literary reviews, Ceci n’est pas de la littérature. Her first novel, Mousseline la Sérieuse, published in 2016 by Éditions Héloïse d'Ormesson, received the prix littéraire des Princes and the prix d’Histoire du Cercle de l’Union interalliée.

References

French writers
20th-century French novelists
Year of birth missing (living people)
Living people